Shiley Hall is an academic building on the University of Portland campus in Portland, Oregon, United States.

References

Buildings and structures in Portland, Oregon
University of Portland campus